David Norbrook (born 1 June 1950) was Merton Professor of English literature at Oxford University from 2002 to 2014, and is a now an Emeritus Fellow of Merton College, Oxford. He specializes in literature, politics and historiography in the early modern period, and in early modern women's writing. He is currently writing a biography and edition of Lucy Hutchinson. He teaches in literary theory and early modern texts, in early modern women writers, and in Shakespeare, Milton and Marvell. Before his current role, he taught at the University of Maryland.

Norbrook was educated at Aberdeen Grammar School, the University of Aberdeen and Balliol College, Oxford. He became fellow and tutor in English Language and Literature at Magdalen College, Oxford in 1978, and offered some support to the radical pressure group Oxford English Limited in the late 1980s. He is the author of Poetry and Politics in the English Renaissance, Writing the English Republic: Poetry, Rhetoric and Politics, 1627-1660, and The Penguin Book of Renaissance Verse.

Academic studies
Professor Norbrook's historiographical studies of Renaissance English Literature explain the poetry, drama and prose writings of the period 1509-1659 in the political context of the period. Renaissance English poetry was closely involved with affairs of state: some poets held high office, others wrote to influence those in power and to sway an increasingly independent public opinion. In Poetry and Politics in the English Renaissance, Norbrook explains the political context and events that influenced writers such as Sir Philip Sidney, Edmund Spenser, Ben Jonson, and John Milton.

Norbrook's work shares a certain affinity with that of Stephen Greenblatt, although Norbrook is not regarded as a member of the new historicist school.

Norbrook has championed the work of minor and neglected poets from the Renaissance period.

Personal life
He is married to Sharon Achinstein Norbrook, Sir William Osler Professor of English at Oxford University; daughter of philosopher Peter Achinstein; and granddaughter of economist Asher Achinstein.

References

1950 births
Living people
British literary historians
Fellows of Merton College, Oxford
Fellows of Magdalen College, Oxford
Alumni of Balliol College, Oxford
Alumni of the University of Aberdeen
University of Maryland, College Park faculty
Merton Professors of English Literature